Enteromius aliciae is a species of ray-finned fish in the genus Enteromius. It has been reported only from two locations in Saint John River, Liberia, and Saint Paul River, Guinea; and is threatened by siltation of its habitat, consequent upon deforestation.

Footnotes 

Enteromius
Taxa named by Rémy Bigorne
Taxa named by Christian Lévêque
Fish described in 1993